Tooth remineralization is the natural repair process for non-cavitated tooth lesions, in which calcium, phosphate and sometimes fluoride ions are deposited into crystal voids in demineralised enamel. Remineralization can contribute towards restoring strength and function within tooth structure.

Demineralization is the removal of minerals (mainly calcium) from any of the hard tissues: enamel, dentine, and cementum. It begins at the surface, and may progress into either cavitation (tooth decay) or erosion (tooth wear). Tooth decay demineralization is caused by acids from bacteria in the dental plaque biofilm whilst tooth wear is caused by acids from non-bacterial sources. These can be extrinsic  in source, such as carbonated drinks, or intrinsic acids, usually from stomach acid coming into the mouth. Both types of demineralization will progress if the acid attacks continue unless arrested or reversed by remineralization.

Tooth decay process

When food or drinks containing fermentable sugars enter the mouth, the bacteria in dental plaque rapidly feed on the sugars and produce organic acids as by-products. The glucose produced from starch by salivary amylase is also digested by the bacteria. When enough acid is produced so that the pH goes below 5.5, the acid dissolves carbonated hydroxyapatite, the main component of tooth enamel. The plaque can hold the acids in contact with the tooth for up to two hours, before it is neutralized by saliva. Once the plaque acid has been neutralized, the minerals can return from the plaque and saliva to the enamel surface.

However, the capacity for remineralization is limited, and if sugars enter the mouth too frequently then a net loss of minerals from enamel produces a cavity, through which bacteria can infect the inner tooth and destroy the latticework. This process requires many months or years.

Natural tooth remineralization

Role of saliva 

Remineralization occurs on a daily basis after attack by acids from food, through the presence of calcium, phosphate and fluoride found in saliva.
Saliva also acts as a natural buffer to neutralize acid, preventing demineralization in the first place. If there is reduced saliva flow or reduced saliva quality, this will increase the risk of demineralization and create the need for treatment in order to prevent demineralization progression.

Saliva function can be organized into five major categories that serve to maintain oral health and create an appropriate ecologic balance:

 Lubrication and protection
 Buffering action and clearance
 Maintenance of tooth integrity
 Antibacterial activity
 Taste and digestion.

As the demineralization process continues, the pH of the mouth becomes more acidic which promotes the development of cavities. Dissolved minerals then diffuse out of the tooth structure and into the saliva surrounding the tooth. The buffering capacity of saliva greatly impacts the pH of plaque surrounding the enamel, thereby inhibiting caries progression. Plaque thickness and the number of bacteria present determine the effectiveness of salivary buffers. The high salivary concentrations of calcium and phosphate which are maintained by salivary proteins may account for the development and remineralization of enamel. The presence of fluoride in saliva speeds up crystal precipitation forming a fluorapatite-like coating which will be more resistant to caries.

Treatment and prevention 
Besides professional dental care, there are other ways for promoting tooth remineralization:

Fluoride

Fluoride therapy 
Fluoride is a mineral found naturally in rock, air, soil, plants and water and may assist by:
 Potentially repairing early white spot lesions found on the tooth surface that may develop into cavities. 
And a reduction in cavities may result in the following downstream benefits:
 Protecting children and adults against tooth decay 
 Helps prevent premature tooth loss of baby teeth due to decay and overall assists in guiding the adult teeth to correct tooth eruption. 
 Aids in the prevention of invasive dental treatment therefore reducing the amount of money spent on dental treatment  
 Provides an overall community advantage, especially individuals from low socioeconomic communities, who have less access to other forms of fluoride treatments 
 Evidence confirms that water fluoridation is a safe and effective way to help protect teeth against decay 
 The addition of fluoride to the water does not alter the taste or smell of the drinking water 

Fluoride therapy is often used to promote remineralization. This produces the stronger and more acid-resistant fluorapatite, rather than the natural hydroxyapatite. Both materials are made of calcium. In fluorapatite, fluoride takes the place of a hydroxide.

Effect of fluoride
The presence of fluoride in saliva and plaque fluid interacts with remineralization process in many ways and thus exerts a topical or surface effect. A person living in an area with fluoridated water may experience rises of fluoride concentration in saliva to about 0.04 mg/L several times during a day. Technically, this fluoride does not prevent cavities but rather controls the rate at which they develop making them take a lot longer and making them easier to prevent via normal brushing as it will take a higher amount of acid, usually built up over a number of days, to destroy the created fluorapatite. When fluoride ions are present in plaque fluid along with dissolved hydroxyapatite, and the pH is higher than 4.5, a fluorapatite-like remineralised veneer is formed over the remaining surface of the enamel; this veneer is much more acid-resistant than the original hydroxyapatite, and is formed more quickly than ordinary remineralised enamel would be. The cavity-prevention effect of fluoride is partly due to these surface effects, which occur during and after tooth eruption. Fluoride interferes with the process of tooth decay as fluoride intake during the period of enamel development for up to 7 years of age; the fluoride alters the structure of the developing enamel making it more resistant to acid attack.  In children and adults when teeth are subjected to the alternating stages of demineralisation and remineralization, the presence of fluoride intake encourages remineralization and ensures that the enamel crystals that are laid down are of improved quality. Fluoride is commonly found in toothpastes. Fluoride can be delivered to many parts of the oral cavity during brushing, including the tooth surface, saliva, soft tissues and remaining plaque biofilm. 
Some remineralization methods may work for "white spot lesions" but not necessarily "intact tooth surfaces".

Fluoridated toothpaste
Regular use of a fluoridated toothpaste has been shown to provide a significant source of fluoride to the mouth by the means of direct fluoride contact to tooth structure. The types of fluoride added to toothpaste include: sodium fluoride, sodium monofluorophosphate (MFP), and stannous fluoride.

As stated previously, fluoride has been proven to positively affect the remineralization process through fluorapatite-like veneer formation. Therefore, by using an adequately fluoridated toothpaste regularly, this assists the remineralization process of any hard tooth tissues.

Fluoride varnish 
Fluoride varnishes were developed late 1960s and early 1970s and since then they have been used both as a preventative agent in public health programs and as a specific treatment for patients at risk of caries by the 1980s, mostly in European countries. Fluoride varnishes were developed primarily to overcome their shortcoming which is to prolong the contact time between fluoride and tooth surfaces. Furthermore, when compared to other existing topical fluoride the advantages of fluoride varnishes application are being a quick and easy procedure for the clinicians, reduced discomfort for the receiving patients, and greater acceptability by the patients. Fluoride varnishes are a concentrated topical fluoride containing 5% sodium fluoride (NaF) except the Fluor protector which contains difluorosilane. There are many types of fluoride varnishes and among them the popular brands are Duraphat and Fluor Protector. Currently, the anti-caries effect fluoride varnishes are backed up by Cochrane systematic reviews, 2002 which was updated in 2013 included 22 trials with 12,455 children aged 1–15 years old. The conclusion made is similar to its previous review, a 46% reduction in D(M)FS and 33% reduction in d (e/m)fs in permanent teeth and deciduous teeth respectively

Water fluoridation 
Community water fluoridation is the addition of fluoride in the drinking water with the aim of reducing tooth decay by adjusting the natural fluoride concentration of water to that recommended for improving oral health. The NHMRC an Australian Government statutory body, released the public statement of efficacy and safety of fluoridation 2007 to set the recommended water fluoridation to the target range of 0.6 to 1.1 mg/L, depending on climate, to balance reduction of dental caries (tooth decay) and occurrence of dental fluorosis (mottling of teeth).  Moreover the public statement states that the fluoridation of drinking water is an effective way to ensure the community is exposed to fluoride and can benefit from its preventative role in tooth decay.

Plaque control
Oral hygiene practices involve the mechanical removal of plaque from hard tissue surfaces  Cariogenic bacteria levels in the plaque determine whether caries will occur or not, therefore, effective removal of plaque is paramount. The removal of plaque inhibits demineralisation of teeth, and reversely increases opportunities for remineralization.

Diet
Demineralization is caused by bacteria excreting acids as a product of their metabolism of carbohydrates. By reducing the intake frequency of carbohydrates in an individual's diet, remineralization is increased and demineralization is decreased. Diet control is an important aspect in promoting remineralization to occur naturally. A loss of the tooth enamel structure and cavitation may occur if the demineralization phase continues for a long period of time. This disturbance of demineralisation caused by the presence of fermentable carbohydrates continues until the saliva has returned to a normal pH and had sufficient time to penetrate and neutralize the acids within any cariogenic biofilm present.

Increased sugar consumption in the means of foods and drinks containing high levels of sugar are known to be associated with high rates of dental decay. As a result, members of the dental team routinely assess patients' diets and highlight areas where this could be improved to reduce the risk of dental decay. A balanced diet is an important contributing factor towards oral health and general health. It is common knowledge that certain dietary habits contribute to disease, whether patients take note of advice which is given to them and change their diet as a result, is less certain.

Recent studies on diet and caries have been confounded by the widespread use of fluoride toothpastes.  Studies have argued that with greater exposure to fluoride, the sugar consumption/caries relationship may be weaker in the modern age than previously thought, with fluoride raising the threshold of sugar intake at which caries progresses to cavitation. It has been concluded in modern societies that a significant relationship between sugars and caries persists despite the regular widespread use of fluoride toothpaste. Several reviews conclude that high sugar consumption continues to be the main threat for dental health of whole populations in some developed and many developing countries. Therefore, a key strategy to further reducing levels of caries in individuals as well as for populations, is by means of reducing the frequency of sugar intakes in the diet.

Foods high in refined carbohydrates, such as concentrated fruit snack bars, sweets, muesli bars, sweet biscuits, some breakfast cereals and sugary drinks including juices can contribute to dental decay, especially if eaten often and over long periods as the sugar nourishes the cariogenic bacteria in mouth. The bacteria produce acid, which destroys teeth. Highly refined packaged foods such as savory crackers and chips can also have high levels of carbohydrates. It is important to check the nutritional information panel on packaged foods to determine which foods and drinks have high carbohydrate concentrations.

To prevent demineralisation in the mouth, it is important for an individual to ensure they have a well-balanced diet, including foods containing calcium and foods that are low in acids and sugars. The individual should have a diet high in fresh fruits and vegetables, wholegrain cereals, legumes, seeds and nuts. Sugary snacks including lollies, fruit bars, muesli bars, biscuits, dried fruit, cordials, juices and soft drinks should be limited as they contribute to dental decay and dental erosion. Additionally, excessive starchy foods (such as bread, pasta, and crackers), fruits and milk products consumed frequently can cause the growth of dental plaque and bacteria. Therefore healthy eating, healthy drinking and proper maintenance of oral hygiene is the best way to promote and maintain sound tooth structure for an individual.

Xylitol, Sorbitol, and Erythritol
Xylitol is a naturally-occurring sweetener that can be synthetically produced in bulk. It is classified as a sugar alcohol. Xylitol inhibits acid production by oral bacteria and promotes remineralization of the teeth. It can be found in various products which include chewing gums and lozenges. Xylitol has been found to reduce mutans streptococci in plaque and saliva and reduce the binding of these to the acquired enamel pellicle. This in turn leads to less adherent plaque and a decrease in acid production. In addition, chewing xylitol gum will stimulate increased salivary flow which in turn increases the amount of calcium in the saliva and enhances the oral clearance.

Additional saliva flow which includes chewing products such as gums that contain no fermentable carbohydrates can aid in the modulation of plaque pH. Xylitol is a sugar alcohol which provides the sensation of tasting sweetness in foods, particularly chewing gum, without providing sucrose which is the only sugar that S.mutans are capable of using to produce the polyacrylamide adhesive which allows them bind to the teeth. Xylitol does not actively reduce or harm the presence or capacities of oral bacteria, but rather does not offer them the sustenance to propagate or function. There are often claims of significant dental benefits of Xylitol. These generally derive from the perspectives of; saliva production is increased during chewing and oral stimulation which can help to maintain a more adequate supply of saliva to support normal oral functioning. Also, the idea of Xylitol being a sweetener option which does not serve as fuel for oral bacteria is considered to be the healthier alternative than sucrose (table sugar), fructose, lactose, galactose products. While these considerations may not reverse any conditions in health, they are more so preventative, and do not further the consequential events such as dental caries, malodorous breath, excessive plaque and gingivitis conditions.

Erythritol may have greater protective action than xylitol and sorbitol. However, this research is industry funded and not as comprehensive as the research on xylitol.

Biomimetic glass and ceramics 

Biomimetic glass and ceramic particles, including amorphous calcium sodium phosphosilicate (CSPS, NovaMin) and amorphous calcium phosphate (ACP, Recaldent), are used in some toothpastes and topical preparations to promote remineralization of teeth. These particles have a structure mimicking hydroxyapatite, providing new sites for mineralisation to occur. Their binding to the teeth also occludes open dentin tubules, helping to reduce dentin hypersensitivity. Evidence is insufficient to recommend either for any indications, but the evidence for CSPS is stronger than that for ACP.

Oligopeptide P11-4

P11-4 (Ace-QQRFEWEFEQQ-NH2, Curolox) is a synthetic, pH controlled self-assembling peptide used for biomimetic mineralization e.g. for enamel regeneration or as an oral care agent. It has a high affinity to tooth mineral. 

P11-4 is a self-assembling β-peptide. It builds a 3-D bio-matrix with binding sites for Calcium-ions serving as nucleation point for hydroxyapatite (tooth mineral) formation. The high affinity to tooth mineral is based on matching distances of Ca-ion binding sites on P11-4 and Ca spacing in the crystal lattice of hydroxyapatite. The matrix formation is pH controlled and thus allows control matrix activity and place of formation.

Self assembling properties of P11-4 are used to regenerate early caries lesions. By application of P11-4 on the tooth surface, the peptide diffuse through the intact hypomineralized plate into the early caries lesion body and start, due to the low pH in such a lesion, to self-assemble generating a peptide scaffold mimicking the enamel matrix. Around the newly formed matrix de-novo enamel-crystals are formed from calcium phosphate present in saliva. Through the remineralization caries activity is significantly reduced in comparison with a fluoride treatment alone. In aqueous oral care gels the peptide is present as matrix. It binds directly as matrix to the tooth mineral and forms a stable layer on the teeth. This layer does protect the teeth from acid attacks. It also occludes open dentin tubule and thus reduces the dental sensitivity.

See also

 Calcium lactate
 Calcium phosphate
 Tooth development
 Toothpaste
 Tooth enamel

References

Further reading 

Dentistry procedures